Na Amazônia (In the Amazon) is the seventh album and the second DVD of Banda Calypso, launched in February 2005. The show that gave rise to the project was recorded on November 14, 2004 in Sambódromo of Manaus.

The Show 
The show was exciting, its opening had an Indian theme, the costumes were colorful, with details in birds clothes and forests a pretty typical theme for those in Manaus, with hits of Volume 4 most of the show, can not be denied that the songs were in the general knowledge of there audience, and also the incredible performance of the guitarist Chimbinha, that while Joelma changed clothes, almost burst a totally exciting sound with his wonderful guitar.

The show was very danceable in its first block at the end brings a tribute to Gilberto Barros for help providing the band, the presenter who saw a preview of your live show and did not contain the tears. As in DVD earlier was an act in a love song, but it was the song Disse Adeus, a song that speaks of a time of separation and in the state that the woman was near the end of the song the dancer enacts with Joelma takes her dress so doing all the Sambadrome the public Manaus scream, but to everyone's surprise there was a swimsuit skin color, soon at the end of the song Joelma is carried on the lap and then back it more romantic ballads. The rhythms used in this show much attention, the songs Homem Perfeito and Potpourri de Carimbó had great attention by the used rhythms and presentation on stage.

The show also recalled Joelma of his time in the band Fazendo Arte to rewrite Brincou Comigo, a song she sang alongside Kim Marques. Soon the show ended with the song Paquera, and had a simple but emotional farewell.

Repercussion 
The DVD has become the best selling of the year, even before being launched throughout the country, the DVD already had Triple Diamond. Its lead single was the revival of Pra Te Esquecer, the music in its relaunch obtained huge success, much higher than its original release, but the entire album was a highlight, since even romantic dance music.

Track listing

Charts

Trivia 
 The show was recorded weeks after the release of Volume 6.
 The clip Imagino was recorded at Amazon River, but with the new version in the studio and the clip is present on the DVD.
 During the presentation of the last block Joelma sang as music success Dançando Calypso which ended up not coming to DVD.

References

2005 albums
Banda Calypso albums